Msheireb is a rapid transit station in Doha, Qatar located between Msheireb Downtown Doha and Mushayrib. It serves as a transfer station between the Red, Gold and the Green lines of the Doha Metro and is considered the largest station in the city.

History
In 2015, the station was planned to be completed by mid-2018, with six out of the 12 tunnel boring machine breakthroughs necessary completed. By February 2018, the main steel structure was complete and work moved into the stone roof cladding. In November 2018, work was almost finished, with only final touches being added.

The station opened with the rest of the first phase of the Red Line on 8 May 2019. Service on the Gold Line began when it opened on 22 November of the same year, and Green Line service opened on December 10.

Msheireb Metro Station was awarded the 2020 World Special Prize Interior by the Prix Versailles.

Station layout

The Red and Green lines share the same set of platforms next to each other, while the Gold Line platforms are located east of the others and run perpendicular to them.

References

2019 establishments in Qatar
Doha Metro stations
Railway stations opened in 2019